World Series of Fighting 7: Karakhanyan vs. Palmer was a mixed martial arts event held  in Vancouver, British Columbia, Canada.

Background
Mike Kyle vs. Anthony Johnson was originally scheduled for this event but was later canceled because Kyle was forced off the fight because of a broken toe.

The main event was to crown the inaugural Worlds Series of Fighting Featherweight champion.

This event featured Elvis Mutapčić and Jesse Taylor in their delayed middleweight title tournament semifinal.

Results

Tournament bracket

See also 
 World Series of Fighting
 List of WSOF champions
 List of WSOF events

References

World Series of Fighting events
2013 in Canadian sports
2013 in mixed martial arts
Sport in Vancouver
2013 in British Columbia
Events in Vancouver